Albert J. Smith (February 15, 1894 – April 11, 1939) was an American film actor. He appeared in more than 80 films between 1921 and 1937.

Selected filmography

 The Diamond Queen (1921) - Professor Ramsey
 Terror Trail (1921) - Hunch Henderson
 The Man Trackers (1921) - Hanley
 The Radio King (1922) - Renally
 Wolf Tracks (1923) - 'Wolf' Santell
 The Eagle's Talons (1923) - Thorne's Henchman
 In the Days of Daniel Boone (1923) - Captain Charles Redmond
 The Steel Trail (1923, Serial) - Ralph Dayton
 The Fast Express (1924, Serial) - Edward Winston
 Big Timber (1924) - Fred Hampden
The Measure of a Man (1924) - Jack Flack
 The Sunset Trail (1924) - Dick Fenlow
 The Riddle Rider (1924, Serial)
 The Taming of the West (1925) - Lafe Conners
 Barriers of the Law (1925) - Aide to Redding
 Straight Through (1925) - Granger
 The Burning Trail (1925) - Texas
 Blood and Steel (1925) - Jurgin
 The Meddler (1925) - Bud Meyers
 The Circus Cyclone (1925) - Steve Brant
 Ace of Spades (1925, Serial) - Joe Deneen
 The Scarlet Streak (1925) - Count 'K'
 Strings of Steel (1926) - Peter Allen
 Scotty of the Scouts (1926, Serial) - Eric Jandrau
 Speed Crazed (1926) - Dave Marker
 The Silent Flyer (1926) - Jack Hutchins
 The Call of the Wilderness (1926) - Red Morgan
 Whispering Sage (1927) - Ed Fallows
 Red Clay (1927) - Jack Burr
 Hard Fists (1927) - Charles Crane
 Hills of Peril (1927) - Rand
 Where Trails Begin (1927) - Bruce Hodges
 The Western Rover (1927) - Bud Barstry
 Perils of the Jungle (1927) - Brute Hanley
 The Swift Shadow (1927) - Butch Kemp
 Whispering Smith (1927. Serial)
 The Bullet Mark (1928)
 Law of Fear (1928) - Steve Benton / The Hunchbacked Masked Bandit
 Dog Justice (1928) - Pierre La Grande (prospector)
 Tracked (1928) - Lem Hardy
 The Gate Crasher (1928) - Pedro
 Fury of the Wild (1929) - Red Hawkins
 Outlawed (1929) - Dervish
 The Drifter (1929) - Pete Lawson
 Overland Bound (1929) - Keno Creager
 Shadow Ranch (1930) - Dan Blake
 Desert Vengeance (1931) - McBride
 The Lightning Flyer (1931) - Durkin
 Branded (1931) - Joe Moore
 One Man Law (1932) - Carver (uncredited)
 Border Devils (1932) - Inspector Bell
 Dynamite Ranch (1932) - Red - Henchman
 Hello Trouble (1932) - Jim Vaughn
 The Last Mile (1932) - Drake - Guard
 McKenna of the Mounted (1932) - Sgt. Maj. Hawley (uncredited)
 The Last Man (1932) - Halborn
 Between Fighting Men (1932) - Butch Martin
 Forbidden Trail (1932) - Henchman Burke
 The Telegraph Trail (1933) - Gus Lynch
 The Thrill Hunter (1933) - Sheriff
 Madame Spy (1934) - Lackey
 Honor of the Range (1934) - Smoky - Henchman
 The Most Precious Thing in Life (1934) - Man at Football Game (uncredited)
 The Prescott Kid (1934) - Frazier
 The Westerner (1934) - Sheriff
 Mills of the Gods (1934) - Switchman
 Love Me Forever (1935) - Henchman / Head Carpenter (uncredited)
 Sutter's Gold (1936) - Man (uncredited)
 Pride of the Marines (1936) - Conductor (uncredited)
 The King Steps Out (1936) - Announcer (uncredited)
 Two-Fisted Gentleman (1936) - Manager
 Alibi for Murder (1936) - Mike (uncredited)
 Code of the Range (1936) - Barney Ross
 The Gold Racket (1937) - Fraser
 Prairie Thunder (1937) - Lynch

References

External links

1894 births
1939 deaths
20th-century American male actors
American male film actors
Male actors from Chicago